Lee Joseph Rushworth (born 18 June 1982) is an English cricketer. Rushworth is a right-handed batsman. He was born in Sunderland, Tyne and Wear.

Rushworth represented the Durham Cricket Board in a single List A match against Hertfordshire in the 2001 Cheltenham & Gloucester Trophy. In his only List A match, he scored 12 runs.

References

External links
Lee Rushworth at Cricinfo
Lee Rushworth at CricketArchive

1982 births
Living people
Cricketers from Sunderland
English cricketers
Durham Cricket Board cricketers